Niccolò Musso (active 1618) was an Italian painter of the Baroque period.

He was mostly active in his natal city of Casale Monferrato. He is said to have trained or worked under either Caravaggio for ten years in Rome (Orlandi) or by local tradition under the Carracci in Bologna (Lanzi). He painted for the church of St. Francis in Casale Monferato, representing that saint at the feet of Christ crucified, and angels partaking his lamentations and devotions. The painting is now in the church of Sant’Ilario. He painted a self-portrait which is in the picture gallery of the Museo Civico at Casale. He is also called Niccolo Musso.

References

External links

17th-century Italian painters
Italian male painters
Italian Baroque painters
People from Casale Monferrato
Year of death unknown
Year of birth unknown